Guy Hubart (born 23 February 1960) is a retired Belgian football goalkeeper.

He played for the Liège clubs RFC and Standard, and in between enjoyed a nine-year spell in Portugal. On 29 December 1994, he scored Estrela Amadora's equalizer in a 1–1 league match against GD Chaves.

References

1960 births
Living people
Belgian footballers
Belgian expatriate footballers
Expatriate footballers in Portugal
Belgian expatriate sportspeople in Portugal
RFC Liège players
Boavista F.C. players
C.F. Estrela da Amadora players
Standard Liège players
Primeira Liga players
Belgian Pro League players
Association football goalkeepers
People from Huy
Footballers from Liège Province